Galatasaray S.K. U21, commonly known as Galatasaray S.K. B is a football club based in Istanbul, Turkey. It is the reserve team of Galatasaray and the club play in the U21 Ligi.

History 
They have been members of the Turkish Youth league formed in 1988 and Turkish PAF League formed in 1999. They play their home games at Metin Oktay Facilities in Florya, which is also the training ground of Galatasaray S.K. The team mainly consists of Under-21 players at the club, although senior players occasionally play in the reserve side, under special conditions.

The reserves head coach is Erkan Ültanır, who picks and manages the side. Galatasaray PAF won the Turkish PAF league titles in last three years.

Honours 
U21 Ligi
Winners (7): (record) 1989–90, 1993–94, 2004–05, 2005–06, 2006–07, 2010–11, 2014–15
Runners-up (2): 1996–97, 2007–08

Former managers 
  Abdullah Avcı (2004–2005)
  Suat Kaya (2004–2006)
  Zafer Koç
  Erkan Ültanır
  Nedim Yiğit (2008–2010)
  Orhan Atik (2010–2016)
  Ceyhun Müderrisoğlu (2019–)

Players

Current squad

Coaching staff

References

External links

 Galatasaray Sports Club Official Website

Galatasaray S.K. (football)
A2 Ligi clubs
UEFA Youth League teams
Reserve team football
Youth football in Turkey